Ralph Crookes (9 October 1846 – 15 February 1897) was an English first-class cricketer, who played one match for Yorkshire in 1879 against Kent, at Mote Park, Maidstone.

Crookes was born in Sheffield, Yorkshire, England. His only first-class outing brought him little personal glory.  He scored a 2 not out at number 11 in Yorkshire's first innings, and then a duck when he was promoted to open second time around.  Although he bowled ten overs for just 14 runs in Kent's second innings, he did not take a wicket, and Kent won just seven runs as Yorkshire were bowled out for 114 chasing 121 to win.

He died aged 50, in Sheffield in February 1897.

References

External links
Cricinfo Profile

1846 births
1897 deaths
Cricketers from Sheffield
Yorkshire cricketers
English cricketers
English cricketers of 1864 to 1889